Adriaan Schade van Westrum (14 June 1865 - 19 May 1917) was a member of the editorial staff of the New York Tribune starting in 1910. He was the literary critic since 1913.

Biography
He was born in 1865 in Amsterdam, Netherlands.  In 1885 he migrated to the United States.  From 1895 to 1908 he was the assistant editor of The Critic.  He died on May 19, 1917 at his home at 388 West 136th Street in Manhattan.

References

1865 births
1917 deaths
American literary critics
American newspaper editors
Dutch emigrants to the United States
Dutch literary critics
Dutch newspaper editors
New-York Tribune personnel
Writers from Amsterdam